Penso is a surname. Notable people with the surname include:

 Chris Penso (born 1982), American soccer referee
 Francesco Penso (1665–1737), Italian sculptor
 Hazdayi Penso (1914–?), Turkish basketball player
 Tori Penso (born 1985/86), American soccer referee and player